Gloryland was the official song of the 1994 FIFA World Cup held in the United States.

Instrumental version
The instrumental version, largely based on the traditional spiritual song "Glory, Glory (Lay My Burden Down)", was performed by a formation named "Glory" with Charles John Skarbek as producer, Richard Simon Blaskey as executive producer with Snake (Chris) Davis featured prominently playing on the saxophone.
 
It was released on Mercury Records for American distribution and PolyGram Records Inc. worldwide. The instrumental appears in the 1994 album released under the album entitled Soccer Rocks the Globe.

Tracks:
"Gloryland"
"Gloryland (Action Mix)"
"Gloryland (Emotion Mix)"
"In Gloria (Spanish Version)"

Vocal version

With added lyrics for the World Cup occasion, "Gloryland" became a 1994 song by Daryl Hall and Sounds of Blackness. The song also appears on the official FIFA World Cup album Gloryland World Cup USA 94 under the title Soccer Rocks the Globe.

Daryl Hall and Sounds of Blackness also sang it at the opening ceremonies of the FIFA World Cup with lyrics. It was also used as the theme to ITV's coverage of the tournament.

Charts

See also 
 List of FIFA World Cup songs and anthems

References

1994 singles
American patriotic songs
FIFA World Cup official songs and anthems
Year of song unknown
Songwriter unknown
1994 FIFA World Cup
Daryl Hall songs
Mercury Records singles
PolyGram singles
Phonogram Records singles